The men's 105 kilograms event at the 2015 World Weightlifting Championships was held on 26 and 27 November 2015 in Houston, United States.

Schedule

Medalists

Records

Results

References

Results 

2015 World Weightlifting Championships